The South Coast railway line (also known as the Tweed railway line) was a railway from Brisbane, the capital city of Queensland, Australia. The route via the South Coast (now known as the Gold Coast) to Tweed Heads on the border of Queensland and New South Wales. The line operated from 1889 to 1964.  The Gold Coast railway line re-opened in 1996 along a modified alignment in the north and a new route south but does not extend as far south yet as the South Coast line.

History

The Beenleigh railway line opened in 1885 before being extended  from Beenleigh railway station to Southport in 1889. The firm of J. W. Sutton and Company of Kangaroo Point in Brisbane provided materials and aided in bridge construction for the railway line.

A branch line running  from Southport Junction (later renamed Ernest Junction) to Tweed Heads opened on 10 August 1903.

It had been hoped that the New South Wales Government would extend its Casino to Murwillumbah line a further 30 kilometres from Murwillumbah to Tweed Heads, but this did not occur due to cost of resuming the land and the expenses associated with the tunnel and bridge that would be required.

Due to the increasing popularity of the motor car, and political interests in road transport, the Tweed Heads branch closed on 1 July 1961, followed by the Beenleigh to Southport line on 30 June 1964.

Stations
The initial South Coast line officially opened on 24 January 1889 and included stops at:

It included a number of cuts, river crossings, long grades and a tunnel at Ernest Junction that remains in situ (and is now heritage-listed). The second branch of the South Coast line, known as the Nerang-Tweed Heads extension, opened 14 September 1903 and stretched from Ernest Junction to the Queensland-New South Wales border. Stops included:

Route
From Beenleigh, coast-bound trains crossed the Old Pacific Highway three times between there and Yatala.  In between these was the impressive Albert River crossing, made of three steel lattice girder spans.  After passing Stapylton, the alignment was straight and of good standard, before reaching Ormeau.  The alignment began to curve here, eventually reaching the Pimpama River and Pimpama Station.  Coomera station was next, and a short distance later, the line crossed the Coomera River on a large bridge, similar to the Albert River bridge but with four spans instead of three.  The southern floodplain of the river was crossed on timber trestles, leading to Oxenford.  Passing Saltwater Creek, the line went through Helensvale, which had a small halt with little else but a nameboard signalling the station.  After climbing nearly two miles, the railway passed through the curved Ernest Junction Tunnel.  The station was just past here. The Southport branch continued on to Southport, but the Tweed Heads line continued onwards.  Passing the small station of Molendinar, the line passed under the Southport-Nerang Road.  The Nerang River bridge was next.  Then came Nerang and Mudgeeraba stations, today covered by the busy Pacific Motorway.  A tunnel was reached at West Burleigh, before arriving at the station of that name. After crossing Tallebudgera Creek bridge (now also demolished and replaced by the Pacific Motorway) travellers reached Elanora, then came the still extant Currumbin Creek bridge.  From here, the route followed today's Stewart Street between Currumbin and Tugun, the Gold Coast Highway between Tugun and Kirra, Coolangatta Road between Kirra and Coolangatta, and Griffith Street over the border to Tweed Heads.

Services
Passenger trains ran from South Brisbane to Southport with connecting trains from Ernest Junction or Southport to Tweed Heads. Picnic and excursion trains ran through from South Brisbane to Tweed Heads on Sundays.

From opening until around 1910, A12 and B13 class locos were the main motive power.  From there until the 1950s, services were operated exclusively by PB15 class locomotives, the largest locomotive permitted to cross the Logan River. Diesel rail cars of the 1800 and 2000 classes operated some passenger services from the 1950s until closure in the 1960s.

Remains

 The Beenleigh railway line is still in use. 
 The track bed between Ernest Junction and Southport, and between Tugun and Coolangatta, is still visible. 
 The original Nerang station still exist at the Gold Coast Hinterland Heritage Museum at Mudgeeraba.
 The railway bridge over Currumbin Creek was converted to a footbridge. Prior to 1995 the Tallebudgera bridge carried water pipes across the creek.  That bridge has since been demolished to make way for widening of the Pacific Motorway.
 Short sections of the route at Currumbin, Coolangatta and Southport have been reused as a pedestrian/bicycle paths. 
 The Southport tunnel still exists, but the 2 West Burleigh tunnels do not; they were demolished to make way for the Pacific Motorway.
 The Coolangatta station area is now located between Chalk St and Griffith Street.

Replacement
The Gold Coast railway line on a new alignment opened from Beenleigh to Helensvale in 1996, Nerang in 1997, Robina in 1998 and Varsity Lakes in 2009.

See also

 Construction of Queensland railways
 Rail transport in South East Queensland

References

Bibliography

External links

1925 map of the Queensland railway system

Closed railway lines in Queensland
History of Gold Coast, Queensland
Public transport in Queensland
Railway lines opened in 1889
Railway lines opened in 1903
Railway lines closed in 1961
Railway lines closed in 1964
3 ft 6 in gauge railways in Australia